Sandi Sue Sweitzer (born September 16, 1946) is an American former figure skater who competed in pairs with Roy Wagelein. They won the silver medal at the 1968 U.S. Championships and competed at the 1968 Winter Olympics.

Personal life 
Sweitzer was born on September 16, 1946, in Santa Monica, California. She married Roy Wagelein following the 1968 Olympics and the two had a daughter, Kristia, before divorcing.

Career 
Sweitzer was a member of the Pickwick Center Skating Club. She teamed up with Wagelein ahead of the 1967–68 season.

Sweitzer/Wagelein were awarded the silver medal at the 1968 U.S. Championships, having finished second to Cynthia Kauffman / Ronald Kauffman. They were included in the U.S. team to the 1968 Winter Olympics in Grenoble, France. The pair placed 8th in the short program, 6th in the free skate, and 7th overall at the Olympics. Making their final competitive appearance, they placed 8th at the 1968 World Championships in Geneva, Switzerland.

After retiring from competition, Sweitzer/Wagelein performed with the West Company of the Ice Capades for seven years.

Results
With Wagelein

References

1946 births
American female pair skaters
Olympic figure skaters of the United States
Figure skaters at the 1968 Winter Olympics
Living people
21st-century American women
20th-century American women